Former Charlotte Coca-Cola Bottling Company Plant is a historic Coca-Cola bottling factory building located at Charlotte, Mecklenburg County, North Carolina. It was built in 1929–1930, and is a two-story, reinforced concrete building with a red brick veneer and decorative concrete detailing and Art Deco design elements.  The building has a rectangular plan measuring 110 feet by 185 feet, parapet, and Coca-Cola bottles, sculpted of precast concrete, which crown the corner pilasters.

It was added to the National Register of Historic Places in 1998.

References

Industrial buildings and structures on the National Register of Historic Places in North Carolina
Industrial buildings completed in 1930
Buildings and structures in Charlotte, North Carolina
National Register of Historic Places in Mecklenburg County, North Carolina
Art Deco architecture in North Carolina